Johntá Moore Austin (born June 28, 1980) is an American singer-songwriter, arranger, producer, vocalist and rapper signed to Jermaine Dupri's So So Def Recordings. He is known for collaborating with producers Bryan-Michael Cox, Jermaine Dupri and the production duo StarGate. He won two Grammy Awards for his work on the songs "We Belong Together" by Mariah Carey and "Be Without You" by Mary J. Blige.

Early life and career
Austin grew up in Atlanta. In 1989 at the age of 8, Austin hosted the daily television show, Kid's Beat on TBS.  Covering current events, sports and the entertainment world, Austin went on to become the Atlanta Bureau Chief for the CNN weekly news program, Real News for Kids and the reporter for the TBS half-hour weekly, Feed Your Mind. Austin is also related to Dreamville Records signee J.i.D.

Austin grew up singing in church choirs and wanted to become an actor. He interviewed celebrities including Michael Jackson and Michael Jordan, among others, and in 1993 he made his television debut on The Arsenio Hall Show. On the show he said he loved singing and was asked to sing with Arsenio Hall's band.

Songwriting

1996–2004
Austin's first professional credit as a songwriter was the 1996 single "Can't Be Wasting My Time" for singer Mona Lisa.

Austin was signed in the mid-late 1990s to RCA Records before being dropped in favor of R&B singer Tyrese Gibson. However, he ended up writing a few songs for him (including the hit "Sweet Lady") as well as writing for other artists.

In 1998, Austin co-wrote the single "Miss You" for Aaliyah's self-titled third studio album (2001). Instead, it was later included on the posthumously released compilation album, I Care 4 U (2002) alongside other Austin-penned songs "All I Need", "Come Over", and "Don't Worry". Austin co-wrote "Just Be a Man About it" for The Heat, third studio album for Toni Braxton.

2005–2009
Austin co-wrote Mariah Carey's hit 2005 singles, "We Belong Together", "Don't Forget About Us", "It's Like That", and "Shake It Off" from her album The Emancipation of Mimi. "We Belong Together" stayed at number one for fourteen non-consecutive weeks, becoming the second longest-running number one song in US chart history at the time, behind Carey's 1996 collaboration with Boyz II Men on "One Sweet Day" (both songs have since been surpassed by Lil Nas X and Billy Ray Cyrus' 2019 hit single "Old Town Road", which spent 19 weeks at the peak). "We Belong Together" won Grammy's for Best Female R&B Vocal Performance and Best R&B Song. The same year Austin also co-wrote Mary J. Blige's single "Be Without You" from her No. 1 selling CD The Breakthrough and Monica's single "Everytime Tha Beat Drop" from her album The Makings of Me. He is also featured as a guest artist on Jermaine Dupri's 2005 song, "Gotta Getcha" and has co-written few songs on Chris Brown's self-titled debut album in 2005, such as "Yo (Excuse Me Miss)" and "Poppin'". He also co-wrote "With You" for Chris Brown and "Can I Call You" from Marques Houston's debut album MH in 2003.

Austin produced and was featured on the songs "Shortie Like Mine" and "Outta My System", both singles by rapper Bow Wow off his album The Price of Fame. Both of the songs were successful, "Shortie Like Mine" reaching number nine, and "Outta My System" reaching number 14 on the Billboard Hot 100. Austin has confirmed on his Twitter that he is working on Love, Sex & Religion again.

Austin also recently worked on albums by Janet Jackson, Jermaine Dupri, and Whitney Houston.

Austin co-wrote "Still" by Canadian singer Tamia, found on her 2004 release, More, "This Song" by LeToya Luckett, found on her 2006 debut, LeToya, He also co-wrote "My Heart" on Jennifer Hudson's self-titled debut album Jennifer Hudson (2008).

In 2007, Austin co-wrote "Can't Help but Wait" by Trey Songz for his second studio album, Trey Day. The song was nominated for Best Male R&B Vocal Performance at the 51st Annual Grammy Awards. Austin continuing his work with Trey Songz in 2009 and would go on to executive produce and write on his next album Ready. Austin wrote "One Love" with his musical partner Bryan Michael-Cox. Austin also co-wrote "I Need A Girl" which saw radio success reaching No. 6 on the US Hot R&B/Hip-Hop Song chart.

2010–present
In 2010, Austin co-wrote the song "Foolin Around" with Jermaine Dupri and Bryan Michael-Cox for Usher's Grammy award-winning album Raymond v. Raymond. Also, he co-wrote the song "Never Let You Go" for Justin Bieber's debut album My World 2.0. He executive produced and sang background vocal on Passion, Pain & Pleasure, the fourth studio album of Trey Songz.

On June 25, 2010, in Los Angeles, California, at the ASCAP 23rd annual Rhythm & Soul music awards, Austin received the prestigious award of Song of the Decade for "We Belong Together" by Mariah Carey, alongside fellow producer Jermaine Dupri and songwriter Manuel Seal. He is currently a recurring character on the Fox show Star (2016) alongside hip hop legend Queen Latifah.

Solo career
After achieving success writing for other artists, Austin began work on his full-length debut album Ocean Drive on So So Def/Virgin Records. His first single "Lil' More Love" was released on June 7, 2005. It was followed by the release of "Dope Fiend" on November 29 later that year. While the album's first two singles failed to achieve radio/chart success, the label released a third single "Turn It Up" on July 11, 2006 along with a Jadakiss-added version in November.

A fourth single, "Video" featuring Unk was released a year later on July 31, 2007. Following the departure of So So Def Recordings from Virgin Records for Island Def Jam in 2007, the album was pushed back from a February 6, 2007, release to a September 4 release. A final single, the ballad "The One That Got Away" was released in 2008, before the album was eventually shelved.

In 2010, Austin released a digital single "Close Your Eyes".

In 2012, Austin announced the upcoming release of the "Love" EP, part 1 of a three-part release with the subsequent "Sex" and "Religion" EPs to follow. "Love" EP was released on December 12 preceded by the buzz single "What a Feeling" featuring Jermaine Dupri.

Discography

Studio albums
2008: Ocean Drive (Shelved)
2019: Love, Sex, & Religion

EPs
2012: Love

Singles

Featured singles

References

External links
 Official Def Jam page
 Official website

1980 births
Living people
African-American male singer-songwriters
African-American record producers
American hip hop record producers
American hip hop singers
American contemporary R&B singers
Grammy Award winners
Island Records artists
Musicians from Atlanta
Record producers from Georgia (U.S. state)
So So Def Recordings artists
21st-century African-American male singers
Singer-songwriters from Georgia (U.S. state)